Apam Senior High School is a co-educational senior high school at Apam in the Gomoa West District of the Central Region of Ghana.

History
Apam Senior High School, in the Zone B District of the Central region of Ghana, was established in 1953 at Paado's plains, a suburb of Apam (a coastal town in the area). The school had a very humble beginning under a cocoa shed and oak trees. It started under the management of Rev. DeGraft-Johnson as a day school with Mr. C.S  Arthur Hesse as the only teacher.

In 1960, the school relocated to its present site, Mbofra mfa Adwen, with a very grand and impressive opening ceremony performed by Lord Listowel, the last Governor of the then Gold Coast, now Ghana. The development of the school that led to the adoption of the name Great Apass was achieved under the  leadership and aegis of the late Dr. Peter Augustus Owiredu otherwise known as PAO. Dr. P.A Owiredu took over as the headmaster from Rev. Degraft-Johnson in 1959 to 1981(?).

By 1964, the school had moved from a day school to a boarding school and had introduced Advanced Level subjects in the Arts and Sciences in addition to the Ordinary Level courses it offered.

Great Apass is presently under the leadership of Nana E. C. Acquah. The school has a current student population of 1,808 with 63 teaching staff and 48 non- teaching staff.

Programmes run by the school include; General Arts, Business, Science, Home Economics, Visual Arts and Agriculture Science recently added.

HEADSHIP

1.        1953 - 1958                 Rev. J. W. De-Graft Johnson

2.        1959 - 1979                 Dr. P.A. Owiredu

3.        1980 - 1988                 Mr. Sam Parry

4.        1988 - 2004                 Mrs. Esther Hamilton

5.         2004 - 2016               Mr. Archibold K. Fuah

6.        2016- 2019                 Nana E. C. Acquah

7.        2019- Date                 Mrs. Jemima Elsie Arthur-Morrison

Notable alumni

 Nene Amegatcher, lawyer, academic and judge; active Justice of the Supreme Court of Ghana (2019 – date)
 Kwasi Anin-Yeboah, lawyer and judge; current Chief Justice of Ghana (2019 – date)
 Kojo Armah, diplomat, lawyer and politician
 David Dontoh, actor and television personality
 Nii Ashie Kotey, judge and academic; active Justice of the Supreme Court of Ghana (2019 – date)
 Nana Kuffour, footballer  
 Aaron Mike Oquaye, politician; former Speaker of the Parliament of Ghana (2017 – 2020)
 Ato Quayson, Professor of English at Stanford University, formerly at New York University, and Professor and inaugural Director of the Centre for Diaspora Studies at the university of Toronto.

References

High schools in Ghana
Central Region (Ghana)
Educational institutions established in 1953
1953 establishments in Gold Coast (British colony)